Calibers in the size range of (mm, inches): 
2 mm (.079+ caliber)
3 mm (.118+ caliber)
4 mm (.157+ caliber)
5 mm (.197+ caliber)
6 mm (.236+ caliber)
7 mm (.276+ caliber)
8 mm (.315+ caliber)
9 mm (.354+ caliber)
10 mm (.394+ caliber)
11 mm (.433+ caliber)
12 mm (.472+ caliber)
13 mm (.511+ caliber)

See also
Table of handgun and rifle cartridges
By name
 List of Winchester Center Fire cartridges
 Winchester Short Magnum
 Winchester Super Short Magnum
 Remington Ultra Magnum
 ICL cartridges

Cartridges by caliber

caliber